Peninsular Spanish (also known as the Spanish of Spain, European Spanish, Iberian Spanish or Spanish Spanish is the set of varieties of the Spanish language spoken in peninsular Spain, as opposed to the Americas, the Canary Islands and Equatorial Guinea. The related term Castilian Spanish is often applied to formal varieties of Spanish as spoken in Spain. According to folk tradition, the "purest" form of Peninsular Spanish is spoken in Valladolid, although the concept of "pure" languages has been rejected by modern linguists.

In other varieties, the two phonemes are realized as a single /s/. The distinction is usually simply labelled distinción, while the lack of distinction between the two is called seseo or ceceo, depending on the phonetic outcome ([s] in the former case,  in the latter).

Morphologically, the most notable distinguishing feature of Peninsular Spanish is the use of the pronoun vosotros (along with its oblique form os) and its corresponding verb forms for the second person plural familiar. In virtually all other varieties of Modern Spanish (with the exception of Equatoguinean Spanish), for the second person plural, the familiar and the formal are merged into ustedes, with its verb forms. Again, the use of vosotros is uncommon in the Canary Islands and only partially introduced in Western Andalusia.

Variants
Variation in Peninsular Spanish, especially phonetic, largely follows a north-south axis, often imagined or characterized as Castilian versus Andalusian in the popular imagination. That said, different isoglosses intersect and never exactly coincide with regional borders.
The Spanish dialects of bilingual regions, such as Castrapo in Galicia or Catalan Spanish, have their own features due to language contact.

A simple, north-south division is:
northern dialects (Castile (including Madrid), León, Cantabria, the Basque Country, Aragon, and Spanish-speaking Catalonia)
southern dialects (Andalusian Spanish, Extremaduran Spanish, Murcian Spanish)

Another north-south division would include a central-northern, found north of Madrid and equated with Castilian Spanish, a southern or Andalusian dialect, and an intermediary zone. This division doesn't include the Spanish of bilingual regions.

While a more narrow division includes the following dialect regions:
 northern Castile, including Salamanca, Valladolid, Burgos, and neighboring provinces;
 northern Extremadura and Leon, including the province of Cáceres, parts of Leon, western Salamanca province, and Zamora
 Galicia, referring to the Spanish spoken both monolingually and in contact with Galician
 Asturias, especially inland areas such as Oviedo
 the interior Cantabrian region, to the south of Santander
 the Basque Country, including Spanish as spoken monolingually and incontact with Basque
 Catalonia, including Spanish spoken in contact with Catalan
southeastern Spain, including much of Valencia, Alicante, Murcia, Albacete, and southeastern La Mancha
 eastern Andalusia, including Granada, Almería, and surrounding areas
 western Andalusia, including Seville, Huelva, Cádiz, and the Extremaduran province of Badajoz – the Spanish of Gibraltar is also included
 south-central and southwest Spain, including areas to the south of Madrid such as Toledo and Ciudad Real.

Variation 
Dialectal variation in the Peninsula follows both north-south and east-west axes.

Leísmo is native to a large swath of western Castile, as well as Cantabria and neighboring parts of Leon and Extremadura.

In much of eastern Castile, as well as Navarre, Aragon and Álava, the clitic pronoun  can express plural number, becoming , when it follows an infinitive, gerund, or subjunctive form used to express a command, as in  'to get married',  'sit down'.

In an area of northern Spain, centered on Burgos, La Rioja, Álava and Vizcaya and also including Guipúzcoa, Navarra, Cantabria and Palencia, the imperfect subjunctive forms tend to be replaced by conditional ones.

In rural Aragon and Navarre, the cluster  often undergoes a few changes. The  can become devoiced and assibilated, while the  may be retracted. Overall, this gives the cluster a sound similar to that of the English . Similarly, the trilled  may also be assibilated in this region. The same pronunciations are also found in much of Latin America, especially Mexico, Central America, and the Andes.

In a chunk of northwestern Spain which includes Galicia and Bilbao and excludes Barcelona, Madrid, and Seville, the sequence  in words such as  'athlete' and  'Atlantic' is treated as an onset cluster, with both consonants being part of the same syllable. The same is true in the Canary Islands and most of Latin America, with the exception of Puerto Rico. Thus,  are the resulting pronunciations.

Differences from American Spanish

The Spanish language is a pluricentric language. Spanish is spoken in numerous countries around the world, each with differing standards. However, the Real Academia Española (Royal Spanish Academy), based in Madrid, Spain, is affiliated with the national language academies of 22 other hispanophone nations through the Association of Academies of the Spanish Language, and their coordinated resolutions are typically accepted in other countries, especially those related to spelling. Also, the Instituto Cervantes, an agency of the Government of Spain in charge of promoting the Spanish language abroad, has been adopted by other countries as the authority to officially recognize and certify the Spanish level of non-native Spanish speakers as their second language, as happens in Australia, South Korea or Switzerland. 

The variants of Spanish spoken in Spain and its former colonies vary significantly in grammar and pronunciation, as well as in the use of idioms. Courses of Spanish as a second language commonly use Mexican Spanish in the United States and Canada, whereas European Spanish is typically preferred in Europe.

Dialects in central and northern Spain and Latin American Spanish contain several differences, the most apparent being  (distinction), i.e., the pronunciation of the letter z before all vowels, and of c before e and i, as a voiceless dental fricative , as in English th in thing.

Additionally, all Latin American dialects drop the familiar (that is, informal)  verb forms for the second person plural, using  in all contexts. In most of Spain,  is used only in a formal context.

Some other minor differences are:
This sound is also prevalent in Colombian Paisa region, and Andean Spanish dialects.
In Spain, this is most common in southern Spain: Andalusia, Extremadura, Murcia, Community of Madrid, La Mancha, etc., as well as in the Canary Islands; in the Americas it is the general pronunciation in most coastal and lowland regions.
 Words containing the three letters  together are pronounced in a different way in Castilian Spanish as compared to Mexican Spanish.
There are several sub-varieties of voseo within Latin America and many Latin American varieties do not have any form of voseo at all.

Vocabulary
The meaning of certain words may differ greatly between all the dialects of the language:  refers to car in some Latin American dialects but to cart in Spain and some Latin American dialects.

Speakers from Latin America tend to use words and polite-set expressions that, even if recognized by the Real Academia Española, are not widely used nowadays (some of them are even deemed as anachronisms) by speakers of Castilian Spanish.
Below are select vocabulary differences between Spain and other Spanish-speaking countries. Words in bold are unique to Spain and not used in any other country (except for perhaps Equatorial Guinea which speaks a very closely related dialect, and to a lesser extent the Philippines).

References

Bibliography

External links
Constraint interaction in Spanish /s/-aspiration: three Peninsular varieties, Richard E. Morris
Coda obstruents and local constraint conjunction in north-central Peninsular Spanish, Richard E. Morris
  Jergas de habla hispana Spanish dictionary specializing in slang and colloquial expressions, featuring all Spanish-speaking countries.
COSER, Audible Corpus of Spoken Rural Spanish

Spanish dialects of Spain